The poko noctuid moth (Agrotis crinigera) is a moth in the family Noctuidae. The species was first described by Arthur Gardiner Butler in 1881.

It is endemic to the Hawaiian islands of Maui, Hawaiʻi, and Oʻahu. It was said to be sometimes very abundant in the 19th century, occurring in thousands and mostly found close to the sea level. Its caterpillar was known as the larger Hawaiian cutworm.
 
The last living moths were seen in 1926. Five specimens have been preserved in the British Museum collection.

The larvae have been recorded on various garden plants (especially legumes), beans, corn, cowpea, Datura, grasses, peas, Portulaca, Sida and sugarcane.

Sources

Agrotis
Endemic moths of Hawaii
Taxonomy articles created by Polbot